The Mercedes-Benz M120 engine is a naturally aspirated high-performance automobile piston V12 engine family used in the 1990s and 2000s in Mercedes' flagship models.

The M120 family is built in Stuttgart, Germany. It has an aluminium engine block lined with silicon/aluminium. The aluminium DOHC cylinder heads are 4 valves per cylinder designs. It uses sequential fuel injection (SFI) and features forged steel connecting rods.

The M120 was eventually replaced by the smaller, lesser-powered, short-lived, SOHC, three valves per cylinder, 5.8L, M137 V12 engine.
Mercedes ceased production of the M120 because of new emission rules.

M120 6.0 48v

In
1992 only the M120 engine was offered in North America in  format and from 1991-92  In Europe.
All other years 1993–1999 have the  version.

Applications:
 1992–1999 600 SEC / S 600 Coupé / CL 600
 1991–1998 600 SE / 600 SEL / S 600
 1992–2001 600 SL / SL 600

Larger displacement M120s 

In 1997, the FIA GT Championship race car Mercedes-Benz CLK GTR was fitted with the M297 engine, derived from the M120. The 25 road cars, required by the FIA rules and delivered in 1999, had their engine enlarged to 6.9 L. There was also a 7.3 L version producing  developed by AMG which was also used in the SL73 AMG, S73 AMG and CL73 AMG. The 7.3 L M297 engine was also featured in the AMG-built, S73 T Kombi, a custom-built W140 S-Class wagon for the Sultan of Brunei. Eighteen units were produced, ten of which went to the Sultan.

A 7.1 L (7,055 cc) version was also used in the SL70 AMG, S70 AMG and CL70 AMG, and produced .

Another 7.1 L (7,055 cc) version with 510 PS (380 kW; 500 hp) was used for SL72 AMG, S72 AMG and CL72 AMG cars.

Pagani Zonda
The Pagani Zonda has used 3 different capacity, Mercedes-AMG tuned, versions of the M120 engine starting with the untuned 6.0 L for the original Zonda C12 to a 7.0 L version for the C12-S and Zonda GR, then to the 7.3 L for the Zonda S 7.3, Zonda F, Zonda Cinque and the Zonda Tricolore, and back to the 6.0 L for the Zonda R and the Zonda Revolucion.

Applications:

References

See also

 List of Mercedes-Benz engines

M120
V12 engines
Gasoline engines by model